Countess Walewska may refer to:
 Marie Walewska, Polish noblewoman
 Countess Walewska (1914 film), a Polish historical film
 Countess Walewska (1920 film), a German silent historical film